The International Museum of Surgical Science is a museum located in the Gold Coast neighborhood of Chicago, Illinois. It is operated by The International College of Surgeons and features exhibits dealing with various aspects of Eastern and Western medicine.  It was founded by Dr. Max Thorek in 1954. The museum's exhibits are displayed by theme or surgical discipline.  Displays include photographs, paintings and drawings, sculpture, medical equipment, skeletons, medical specimens and historic artifacts. The library contains more than 5,000 rare medical texts.

Housed in a 1917 mansion designed by Howard Van Doren Shaw as a replica of he Petit Trianon at Versailles, the museum was originally built for Chicago socialite Eleanor Robinson Countiss Whiting who died in 1931. The International College of Surgeons acquired the building in 1950. In addition to displaying medical artifacts the museum has, since 1998, hosted a number of contemporary art exhibitions in an effort to broaden its appeal to visitors. In 2010 visitor numbers were at 20,000 a year, by 2013 this had increased to between 25,000 and 30,000.

See also

 Visual arts of Chicago 
 The Mütter Museum 
 Gold Coast Historic District 
 Lake Shore Drive

References

External links 
 International Museum of Surgical Science Website

Museums in Chicago
Medical museums in Illinois
Science museums in Illinois